The policy of the Soviet Union towards the Iran–Iraq War from 1980 to 1988 varied, beginning with a stance of "strict neutrality" and moving towards massive military support for Iraq in the final phase of the war. The war was inconvenient for the USSR, which had aimed to ally itself with both Iran and Iraq. In the first period of the war, the Soviets declared a policy of "strict neutrality" towards the two countries, at the same time urging a negotiated peace. Iraq had been an ally for decades and the Soviets had tried to win over Iran as well, but their offers of friendship were rebuffed by both the pro-Western Shah and the Ayatollah of Iran. After the Iranian revolution, the Islamic Republic established its slogan as "neither East nor West." In 1982, the war turned in Iran's favor and the Iranian leader Ayatollah Khomeini pledged not to stop the conflict until he had overthrown the Iraqi president Saddam Hussein. Such a prospect was unacceptable to the Soviet Union, which now resumed arms sales to Iraq while still maintaining an official policy of neutrality. The Soviets also feared losing Saddam's friendship with the West. After further Iranian gains in 1986, the Soviet Union massively increased its military aid to Iraq. The Soviets were now afraid of the Iranians encouraging Islamic revolution in Central Asia. Soviet aid allowed the Iraqis to mount a counteroffensive which brought the war to an end in August 1988.

Soviet policy towards the Iran–Iraq War
According to Mesbahi, Soviet policy fell into three periods:

"Strict neutrality" (1980–82)
The outbreak of the Iran–Iraq War in September 1980 provided the Soviets with a quandary since they aimed to be friends with both sides. The 1979 Iranian revolution had overthrown the Shah, the USA's key ally in the Middle East. Iran's new anti-American stance presented the USSR with a golden opportunity to win the country over to the Soviet camp. But the war between Iraq and Iran complicated matters. Iraq had been a very close ally of the Soviets since 1958 and in 1972, the USSR and Iraq had signed a Treaty of Friendship and Cooperation in which both countries promised to help each other under threat and to avoid entering hostile alliances against one another. Iraq, along Syria and PLO, had replaced Egypt as the Soviets' chief ally in the region after Egyptian President Anwar Sadat aligned with USA, and recognized Israel in 1977 and made a peace treaty in 1979 . In 1967, Iraq signed an agreement with the USSR to supply the nation with oil in exchange for large-scale access to Eastern Bloc arms. The Soviets were unhappy with Iraq's offensive against Iran, although they avoided issuing an official condemnation. They were reluctant to supply Iraq with more arms although they allowed their Warsaw Pact allies to continue doing so. At the same time, the USSR attempted to court Iran and offered to sell arms to the Iranians, a bid for friendship which was rejected by Tehran, due to its historic distrust of Russia and the Soviet Union. Nevertheless, the USSR's allies, Libya and Syria, sold weapons to the Iranians, presumably with Soviet permission. The Soviets also worried what Western reaction would be if they opted to back either Iraq or Iran. The complicated balancing act of trying to maintain good relations with both Iran and Iraq led the USSR to observe a policy of "strict neutrality" during the opening phase of the war while calling for a negotiated peace.

The USSR tilts towards Iraq (1982–86)
However, the Iranians rebuffed Soviet offers of friendship and by 1982 they also had the upper hand in the war. They decided to push on into Iraq and overthrow Saddam Hussein. This led to a change in Soviet policy from Summer, 1982. The Soviets did not like the implications of an Iranian victory, fearing Tehran would go on to export Islamic revolution elsewhere in the world. Although officially still neutral, the USSR gradually increased economic and military support to Iraq to stop the collapse of Saddam. The Soviets had a commitment not to let an ally be overthrown and support for Iraq also played well with many Arab nations (the Soviets finally achieved diplomatic relations with Oman and the UAE and an agreement to supply arms to Kuwait). In 1983, the actions of the Iranians became increasingly anti-Soviet. The authorities cracked down on the Moscow-backed Iranian communist party, Tudeh, and then expelled 18 Soviet diplomats. The Soviets were also keen to counterbalance Iraq's increasingly friendly relations with the West by boosting military aid to Saddam. Iraq became "the largest recipient of Soviet-bloc military aid among the countries of the Third World". In 1984, Iraq officially established diplomatic relations with the USA. This, combined with the outbreak of the "tanker war" (Iranian-Saudi confrontation over oil tankers in the Persian Gulf) opened the worrying prospect for the Soviets of an increased US presence in the region. The USSR responded with yet more military aid to Saddam.

Active support for Iraq (1986–88)
In 1986–87, the Soviet Union definitely turned to supporting Iraq. The war had been bogged down in a stalemate until the Iranians had taken the Faw Peninsula. This and other military gains offered the prospect of an Iraqi collapse. This worrying development pushed the conservative Arab rulers closer to the USA, which they saw as their protector. The USSR did not relish the idea of increased American military presence in the area. The Soviets were also worried about what would happen in Afghanistan. They had invaded this neighbour of Iran in 1979 and fought a long war there. Iran had provided support to some of the anti-Soviet Afghan Mujahideen. In March, 1987 the Soviets decided to withdraw their forces from Afghanistan, and they were concerned that the vacuum would be filled by an "Islamic fundamentalist" regime. There was also the prospect of Islamist revolution spreading to Soviet Central Asia. This "Islamic factor" became a major concern for the Soviet leadership during the last phase of the Iran–Iraq War and led them to boost arms supplies to Iraq. "The decision to give Iraq the military edge was universal. Not only the Soviet Union, but the entire Western alliance, largely financed by conservative Arab states, engaged in the most comprehensive and massive arms transfer in history to a Third World state engaged in conflict (...) The 'Western package' for Iraq, however, paled in comparison with the Soviets'. Between 1986 and 1988, the Soviets delivered to Iraq arms valued at roughly $8.8 to $9.2 billion, comprising more than 2,000 tanks (including 800 T-72s), 300 fighter aircraft, almost 300 surface-to-air missiles (mostly Scud Bs) and thousands of pieces of heavy artillery and armored personnel vehicles." The massive increase in weaponry allowed Iraq to regain the initiative in the war. At the same time, the USSR continued to press for a ceasefire and offer itself as a mediator. To this end, the Soviets made several economic concessions to Iran and opposed the US reflagging of ships in the Persian Gulf. However, Iran showed little interest in friendship with the USSR, rejecting the Communist world along with the West. Soviet aid allowed Iraq to begin a renewed offensive against Iran in April, 1988, the success of which led to a ceasefire and the end of the war on August 20 of that year.

Support for Iraq
During the Iran–Iraq War from 1980 to 1988, the Soviet Union (USSR) sold or gave more military equipment and supplies to Iraq than did any other country, as well as providing military advisers. The public position of the Soviet Union was officially neutral, especially early in the war. They clandestinely provided a smaller amount of support to Iran. Later in the war they more visibly supported Iraq, but still maintained official neutrality.

At the start of the Iran–Iraq War, while Iraq was on the offensive, the Soviet Union stopped all overt and most covert arms shipments to Iraq for 18 months. Rather than wanting to help Iran, the Soviet Union was probably annoyed with Iraq's president Saddam Hussein, who had refused the Soviets more access to Iraqi ports in exchange for arms. Soviet prestige was at stake if its arms were defeated, so the Soviets began to provide spare parts and ammunition. They later replaced complete vehicles and weapons in one-to-one exchanges. France supported Iraq as the second greatest military supplier, and tended to supply higher-technology equipment than the Soviets.

Motives for policy towards Iraq

When the Iran–Iraq war began, the United Nations (UN) responded with Security Council resolutions calling for a ceasefire and for all member states to refrain from actions contributing to continuing conflict. A key resolution in 1987 was Resolution 598.

The Soviet Union opposed the war and cut off arms exports to both Iran and Iraq, the latter being an ally under a 1972 treaty.

Despite strong policy disagreements with Iraq, the Soviet Union was concerned about the reputation of its weapons and arms deliveries resumed in 1982.

The Iraqi Communist Party, driven from Iraq by the Ba'athist regime, was allowed to broadcast calls for the end of the war from the Soviet Union. This may have been more due to Soviet irritation at the war than a serious attempt to harm Iraq: Iran was not seen as pro-Soviet.

Competition with other countries
France supported Iraq as the second greatest military supplier, and tended to supply higher-technology equipment than the Soviets. The competition between France and the Soviet Union as an arms supplier was a continuing issue for Iraq. Iraq approached the French in late 1980 with requests to buy Crotale and Roland surface-to-air missile systems (SAMs) to augment their depleted Soviet SAM arsenal.

Many other nations provided materials or encouraged client states to do so, and private arms traders also sold arms to both sides.

Soviet training
Iraqi pilots were less aggressive because of their more conservative Soviet training. Yet, French, Indian and Egyptian trainers indicated that Iraqi pilots could be extremely effective after Western-style training that put the initiative in the air in the pilot's cockpit and with his flight leader.

Movement away from Soviet doctrine was also seen in land warfare, where the Iraqis also learned to place greater emphasis on training and preparation for complex combined arms operations. This was seen in the training provided to new recruits and the use of large-scale battle rehearsals.

Intelligence support
Iraq improvised an AWACS using a British Thompson CSF Tiger radar on a Soviet Il-76 airframe, the combination called the Baghdad 1.

Cordesman cites Jane's Defence Weekly as reporting that the Soviet Union had to reschedule its satellite coverage during the more intense periods of tension between Iran and the West. In November and December 1987, the Soviet Union lowered its Kosmos 1983 photo-reconnaissance IMINT satellite to monitor the battlefield between Iraq and Iran. Similarly, it altered the orbit of Kosmos 1985 in a way that implied it either had night coverage of the battlefield or was covering U.S. activity at Diego Garcia. There have been numerous reports that Iraq received intelligence from third countries, especially satellite imagery from the U.S. The Jane's article suggests that the Soviets also might have provided imagery.

Air warfare

At the start of the war, the Iranian air arm had superior equipment to what was largely Soviet equipment in Iraqi hands. The Iraqis used the Soviet air defense model, which gave pilots relatively little initiative.

The Iraqis and Soviets had different priorities for waging air warfare, shown by how each assigned their best pilots to different aircraft types. This conflicted with Saddam Hussein's strict control of the Iraqi military, but over the course of the war some flexibility did emerge. The Iraqis considered ground attack to be the most important and put their best pilots into their French Mirage F-1s rather than Soviet air-superiority fighters and interceptors such as the MiG-25 and MiG-29.

Aircraft

In 1979, the Soviet Union supplied Iraq with 240 fixed-wing and helicopter aircraft, along with military advisors, initially stationed at as-Shoibiyah Air Base 45 km SW of Basra. In early 1987, the Soviet Union delivered a squadron of twenty-four MiG-29 Fulcrums to Baghdad. Considered to be the most advanced Soviet fighter, the MiG-29 had previously only been provided to Yugoslavia, Syria and India. The MiG-29 export deal to Iraq gave a more advantageous payment schedule than any offered by the West: Iraq was caught in a financial crisis and needed the low-interest loans provided by the Soviet Union.

Ground support

In the ground support role, the IQAF provided aircraft for close air support and strike roles and, to a limited extent, for air superiority over the immediate battlefield. In 1980, the Iraqi air force had 12 ground attack squadrons-4 equipped with MiG-23Bs, 2 with Su-7 (NATO reporting name FITTER), 4 with Su-20s (i.e., the export version of the Su-17 FITTER C), and 1 with British Hawker Hunters. They also had some Su-22's, the final upgrade of the Su-17 with Russian/French avionics. Also, the IQAF had two bomber squadrons equipped with Tu-22s (NATO reporting name BLINDER) and Il-28s  (NATO reporting name BEAGLE) respectively, though the latter were probably inoperable.

Transport
Iraq had two transport squadrons whose primary aircraft were Soviet Il-76s (NATO reporting name CANDID) and An-12s (NATO reporting name CUB).

Helicopters
The 11 helicopter squadrons included Soviet Mi-8s (NATO reporting name HIP) and Mi-24s (NATO reporting name HIND), as well as European-designed models. Soviet helicopters had troop transport capability rather than being attack-only.

Air defense

Iranian pilots avoided Iraqi S-75 Dvina (NATO reporting name SA-2 GUIDELINE) and S-125 (NATO reporting name SA-3 GOA) anti-aircraft missiles using American tactics developed in Vietnam, though they were less successful against Iraqi SA-6s optimized for low and medium altitude engagements. "Iran's Western-made air defense system seemed more effective than Iraq's Soviet-made counterpart."

Surface-to-air missiles
Iraq's ground-based air defense suffered from poor leadership as well as both a lack of understanding of the Soviet operational doctrine and technical characteristics of their Soviet SA-2, SA-3, and SA-6 surface-to-air missiles. Iraq adopted Soviet deployment and fire techniques, and relied on standard Soviet tactics without adapting to Iraqi needs. The SA-2, and SA-3 were designed for a medium- to high-altitude threat, tactics which the Iranian Air Force rarely if ever used. By the time of the 1988 ceasefire, Iraq had obtained from the Soviet Union approximately 120 SA-2 launchers, 150 SA-3 launchers, 25–60 SA-6 launchers. The Soviet weapons depended on a low-altitude system of anti-aircraft artillery with SA-7, SA-8, and SA-9 missiles, and eventually the SA-14.

Some Israeli experts came to regard Iraqi ability to manage the command and control and electronic warfare aspects of their Soviet-supplied surface-to-air missile systems as far inferior to those of Syria, even considering the poor Syrian performance in 1982.

Interceptors and air-to-air missiles
Each interceptor squadron was deployed at a separate base for defense of a specific target. Their five interceptor squadrons had limited all-weather capability and were all equipped with MiG-21s (NATO reporting name FISHBED).

The Iraqis were displeased with Soviet air-to-air missiles. Pakistani technicians were reported to have helped the Iraqis modify some MiG-21s to carry the French-made R550 Magic air-to-air missile. The Iraqis claimed to have used a MiG-21 so equipped to down an F-14.

Land warfare
The Soviet Union initially cut off supplies in response to being caught by surprise, but this position was later reversed. Iraq was not prepared for effective infantry combat when the war began. In accordance with Soviet doctrine, the Iraqis placed great stress on the use of tanks and mechanized units during the first stages of the war.

Tanks and armored fighting vehicles

Soviet doctrine emphasized tanks, and Iraq followed its example. It consistently improved its skills with tanks, both Soviet-made and Chinese copies. It also used its attack helicopters with some of the Soviet "flying tank" methods.
Most Iraqi tanks were Soviet, or Chinese copies of Soviet tanks, with more and more acquired during the war. They started in 1979 with 2,500 older T-55 and T-62 model Soviet tanks, and a few more advanced T-72 tanks, probably less than 100. Iraq had roughly 2,750 tanks in late 1980. In early 1988, it had more than 4,500 Soviet T-54s, 55s, 62s, and 72s, some 1,500 Chinese Type 59 and Type 69-II main battle tanks (copies/derivatives of the Soviet T-54A), 60 Romanian M-77s, and some captured Iranian British-made (30?) Chieftains. It is believed that France sold also about 100 AMX-30 to Iraq.

Iraq had about 2,500 other armored vehicles in late 1980. By late 1985, Iraq had about 3,000 AFVs. It had about 5,100 such systems in early 1988, including roughly 1,000 models of the Soviet BMP-1 and BMP-2 armored fighting vehicle. Even during the opening stages of the war, Saddam Hussein was aware that Soviet tank types were individually inferior to those used by the Iranians. In October 1980, he said: "Their [Iran’s] cannons are greater in number, their tanks more advanced, their navy can reach long distance targets, and they have better arms." The Iraqis were unprepared for urban warfare, even using Soviet methods that cost the Soviets heavily in the 1956 Hungarian Revolution.

Iraq's tanks were more effective against Iranian helicopter gunships. The Soviet 12.5mm anti-aircraft machine guns on the Iraqi tanks were of adequate range and lethality to hold Iranian helicopters out of the range of their most lethal anti-tank guided missiles.

Helicopters
Iraq still kept most of its helicopters in its air force at the beginning of the war, which created major problems because of a lack of effective coordination between the air force and forward deployed army units. In mid-1980, it had 35 Mi-4s, 15 Mi-6s, 78 Mi-8s, 18-34 Mi-24s, 47 Alloutte IIIs, 10 Super Frelons, 40 Gazelles, 3 Pumas, and 7 Wessex Mk-52s. By early 1988, it had a strong Army Aviation Corps with 150–200 armed helicopters, including 40–80 Soviet Mi-24s with the 3M11 Falanga (NATO reporting name AT-2 SWATTER), and the rest French, and 86 U.S. designs (either U.S. made or built under license) lightly armed helicopters: 26 Hughes 530F, 30 Hughes 500D, and 30 Hughes 300C.

Army aviation had 10 Mi-6 (NATO reporting name HOOK)  heavy transport helicopters, and 100 Mi-8 (NATO name HIP), 20 Mi-4 (NATO name HOUND), and an additional 10 French Puma medium transport helicopters.

Logistics
The Iraqis made logistic oversupply a key operational principle. They operated on the Soviet system of "supply push", rather than the U.S. system of  "demand pull". Iraqi forces at the front were given massive ammunition stocks and war reserves. This was necessary given their Soviet-style extremely heavy artillery bombardments.

"By the end of 1982, Iraq had been resupplied with new Soviet materiel, and the ground war entered a new phase. Iraq used newly acquired T-55 tanks and T-62 tanks, BM-21 Stalin Organ rocket launchers, and Mi-24 helicopter gunships to prepare a Soviet-type three-line defense, replete with obstacles, minefields, and fortified positions."

The Iraqi Army had about 200,000 men under arms in September 1980, with another 250,000 in the reserves.  It was equipped with almost 3,000 Soviet-built tanks, including about 100 T-72s, 2,500 armored fighting vehicles (AFVs), and about 1,000 tubes of artillery. The tank force was a mixture of T-34/55/62s and PT-76s of Soviet origin and some 100 French AMX-30's, of which more were on order. Mechanized forces included Soviet BTR 50/60/152s, and BMPs, French Panhards and British Ferrets.

Naval warfare
The Iraqi Navy was largely ineffective due to a poor state of training and inadequate Soviet weaponry. Most of the Osa class missile boats were at the lowest level of training and readiness for operations. The Iraqi Navy numbered about 40,000 men and consisted of submarine chasers, patrol boats, missile boats, torpedo boats and minesweepers of Soviet, Turkish and Yugoslavian origin.

Missile technology

While the Soviet Union assisted Iraq with long-range missiles like the SCUD, there is little evidence that they helped the Iraqi development of nuclear, chemical or biological weapons.

Chemical warfare

A raw, redacted CIA report suggested that the Iraqis used Soviet chemical defense equipment. All units in the Iraqi army had some chemical defense capability, using principally Soviet equipment. The basic vehicle-mounted system was composed of: "BBAR" and "RCH 469" chemical attack detectors; "GSP12" chemical concentration measuring device; a small chemical laboratory; night flares and flags to signal the direction of attack.

Iraqi army units of approximately 3,000 men had a 20-man chemical defense unit assigned. This unit was equipped with two "R469" chemical attack detectors; one RS-19, RS-12, or RS-14 vehicle for decontaminating weapons, buildings and roads; and two "DDA" vehicles for decontaminating soldiers. Smaller-units had one-man chemical defense units with a Soviet chemical attack detector and a German Kärcher pressure washer for decontaminating soldiers.

Individual soldiers had Soviet gas masks, and one of three types of chemical defense suits. "Number one" suits, which gave the greatest protection, were used only by chemical units. "Number two" suits covered the torso, hands and legs (in addition to the gas masks), and the "Number three" suits issued to troops consisted of long gloves. All received Yugoslav first-aid packets with two atropine injectors, "tablets for nuclear radiation", and two bottles for spot-cleaning unknown chemicals.

Support for Iran
The Soviet Union did not provide extensive support to Iran during the Iran–Iraq War, not surprisingly given its massive assistance to Iraq,  the mutual antagonism between Marxist-Leninist ideology and the Islamist government of Iran, and Muslim antagonism to the Soviet occupation of Afghanistan.  Nevertheless, the Soviets hoped not to lose all influence. As a 1980 CIA document put it, "The Soviets see Iran as a greater geopolitical prize than Iraq...while hoping to prevent an Iranian turn to the West and to improve their own relations with Tehran", the Soviets also value their ties with Iraq. Timmerman quotes "World Military Expenditures and Arms Transfers", United States Arms Control and Disarmament Agency, Washington, DC, 1985, as conservatively estimating Iran's arms imports over the 1979–83 period at $975 million from the Soviet Union.

After Mikhail Gorbachev took power in 1985, relations improved somewhat. "Support" began to include some diplomatic exchanges and economic cooperation, preparing the way for much better relations after the war ended in 1988. While the fall of the Soviet Union was not foreseen, Gorbachev took a long-term view of Soviet-Iranian relations.

Iran, after the Western embargo of 1979, was motivated to expand its own manufacturing capability and to seek short-term, clandestine procurement of spares and replacements compatible with its Western equipment base. To the extent the Soviet Union could satisfy these needs, it had incentive to do so. Some equipment was shipped from satellite states such as Bulgaria, Poland and Romania. North Korea (see North Korean support for Iran during the Iran–Iraq war both shipped Soviet-designed weapons it made, as well as acting as a conduit for shipments directly from the Soviet Union and the China, even though China was a rival of the Soviets for Middle East influence. Certainly, Soviet clients, such as Libya and Syria, were providing Soviet products to Iran, and the Soviets did not announce a general embargo on them. That the Soviets were willing do so selectively, as when they proposed shipment of advanced naval mines from Libya to Iran, saying "opposed the unauthorized transfer of their military technology to a third country" indicates that some exports were tolerated."After American officials told Moscow of the deal, Soviet officials said they opposed the unauthorized transfer of their military technology to a third country and informed the United States that they had made this policy known to Tripoli," according to Administration officials.

In spite of the antagonism between the U.S. and Iran, Timmerman observed that Iran, as the war continued, sought arms imports from countries that were not subject to, or complying with, U.S. export restrictions. Some of these countries were Soviet clients, or the Soviet Union itself By 1982, the United States Department of State  estimated that more than 40% of Iran's annual $2 billion arms imports originated from North Korea. Much of this equipment was purchased from China or manufactured under license from the Soviet Union. Soviet-bloc weapons were also exported to Iran via Syria, Libya, Romania and Poland- and directly from the Soviet Union. Soviet-compatible equipment also came from the People's Republic of China, perhaps not a superpower but another rival of the Soviet Union. He cites U.S. estimates of Iran's arms imports over the 1979-83 period at $5,365 billion, viz:(emphasis) "$975 million from the Soviet Union, $1.2 billion from the US, $20 million from France, $140 million from the UK, $5 million from FRG, $150 million from Italy, $230 million from the PRC, $5 million from Romania, $40 million from Poland... and $2.6 billion from unspecified "other" sources."

Motivations for Policy
Motivations need to be understood in the context of the time of the Iran–Iraq War, between 1980 and 1988, in which the Soviet Union and the Cold War were still very real. The revolutionary forces that overthrew the Shah resented what they considered continuing U.S. support of an unpopular ruler. At the same time, the Iranian Revolution, starting in January 1978 and leading to the departure of the Shah in January 1979 was Islamic, so not automatically well disposed to a Communist government. Iran, having had an import-oriented policy of the time, needed to obtain weapons from one of the superpowers, or at least an ally who made equipment compatible with one of the superpowers.

Iraq's invasion of Iran, starting the Iran–Iraq War, came shortly after the 1978-1979 Iranian Revolution and the Iranian Hostage Crisis starting in November 1979. The U.S. had been strongly allied with the Shah of Iran, who had bought weapons from the West, primarily but not exclusively from the U.S. Iranian domestic opinion was anti-U.S. because the U.S. had been seen as the patron of the unpopular Shah, Mohammed Reza Pahlevi. The hostage crisis turned a good deal of U.S. public opinion against Iran, so even if the U.S. government, for reasons of state, wanted to support Iran in the Iran–Iraq War, it would face strong domestic resistance. The original U.S. policy of neutrality toward Iran and Iraq, with initial Iraqi military successes, made Iran more eager to find a source of arms, and the Soviet Union capitalized on this opportunity. U.S. domestic opinion was not as much pro-Iraqi as anti-Iranian, which created an opening for the Soviet Union to gain influence in Iran. The Soviets recognized that Iran saw both superpowers as antagonists, and remained open to opportunities, especially under Gorbachev.

Nevertheless, the fact that most Iranian equipment, and training on it, was American, meant that the Soviets could not immediately provide compatible equipment, meant to operate under the doctrines taught to the Iranian military who had not been purged by revolutionary forces.

The USSR, when the war broke out and a policy was not yet in place, arranged to fly jet fuel from Soviet bases to Tehran.  This was followed, by Soviet-ordered shipments from Syria of 130 mm towed field guns M1954 (M-46), tank engines and ammunition. Arranged by Soviet Ambassador Vladimir Vinogradov, two Soviet-Iranian arms cooperation agreements were signed in July 1981. This agreement also provided Soviet advisors, justified as helping defend Iran against U.S. attack, as in the April 1980 Operation Eagle Claw hostage rescue.

Iran reassesses foreign arms dependence
After the revolution, from the early-to-mid-1980s, the Iranians were far more conservative about foreign dependence, so they focused more on internal production. A Military Industries Organization of the Ministry of Defense had been formed in 1969, but was given new authority, as the Defense Industries Organization, in 1981. According to Globalsecurity, the DIO was, at the least, using Soviet designs as a basis for their own work; Iran said it had manufactured an undisclosed number of Oghab rockets, by 1987 (i.e., still during the Iran–Iraq War) that were derived from Soviet-made Scud-B surface-to-surface missiles provided to Iran by Libya.

In 1983, other military manufacturing, controlled by the Islamic Revolutionary Guard Corps (IRGC) was also authorized. This expanded, by the mid-1980s, into the domestic capability to manufacture arms of moderate complexity, such as armored fighting vehicles, artillery, and some missiles and aircraft parts. In all of these developments, direct and indirect technical help from many countries made it possible for Iran to rapidly expand the technical capabilities of her defense industrial base. These countries included...the USSR.

Iran trying to defeat embargoes during the Iran–Iraq War had to rely on a complex web of global arms dealers and inefficient black market money transfers, in which money and weapons could change hands numerous times between different countries. Iranians also were careful not to purchase their arms from a single source and often skillfully pitted one dealer against another in the hope of foiling the attempt of one or all to exert a decisive influence on Iranian policy. Furthermore, the routes for physical delivery of weapons had to be modified too, as Egypt and Saudi Arabia started inspecting and seizing Iranian bound cargo ships through Suez Canal and the Red Sea and these modifications went as far as airlifting of tanks from Syria.

Soviet opportunities to gain influence, as part of broad strategy
Under Gorbachev, new models of Soviet political thinking emerged, which Francis Fukuyama calls "hard" and "soft". The "soft" variant de-emphasizes shared ideology as grounds for assistance, but generally decreased Soviet military aid to the Third World. The "hard" variant, proposed by Karen Brutents (ru; first deputy chief of the Central Committee International Department) and Aleksandr Yakovlev (Politburo member and head of the Foreign Policy Commission), wants cooperation with "large, geopolitically important Third World States, regardless of their ideological orientation." Fukuyama wrote "The area of heaviest Soviet involvement with capitalist Third World states has been the Middle East/Persian Gulf. Moscow has...moved closer to Saudi Arabia and Iran..."

As mentioned in the introduction, Mikhail Gorbachev had a new model of Soviet foreign policy when he came to power in 1985. Rather than supporting only ideologically compatible state, he saw country-specific bilateral agreements, involving economic cooperation, as a means of offsetting US power in the Persian Gulf. Consequently, his “new thinking” also seemed to facilitate a change in Iran’s views towards the Soviet Union. This thinking may have complemented Iranian awareness of their need to improve their economy. In February 1986, therefore, Soviet Deputy Prime Minister Georgi Kornyenko visited Tehran on February 26, 1986, hoping for economic cooperation.

Iran agreed to "expand economic and trade relations, and to conduct joint oil exploration in the Caspian Sea." This gave Gorbachev some ability to balance interests between Iraq and Iran. Iranian official radio broadcast that he urged "increased political contacts". Hashemi Rafsanjani,Speaker of the Iranian Parliament, said Kornyenko's visit, "will have a great effect on our relations with the Soviet Union and the Eastern world...One can be optimistic in fields such as technical, military, economic and possibly political relations. Soviet policy towards Afghanistan and Iraq, however, remained a problem." Iran, shortly after the visit, launched an offensive that regained the Fao Peninsula. Follow-up Soviet official visits, in August and December 1986, resulted in the resumption of Iranian natural gas exports, which had been halted in 1980.

Other opportunities, although primarily realized after the war ended, involved Soviet technology for components and systems beyond the short-term capabilities of Iran to design. Iran had reason to explore Soviet willingness export missile system components that the Iranians could adapt, do final assembly of Soviet aircraft and armored vehicles, and establish licensed Soviet equipment factories in Iran. This primarily happened after the war's end in 1988.

US considers reopening embargo to balance Soviet influence
In 1985, a CIA analyst, Graham Fuller, had proposed that the US should offer to sell weapons to Iran, as a means of blocking Soviet influence there. Robert M. Gates, then head of the CIA National Intelligence Council, advanced the suggestion, which circulated over the signature of Director of Central Intelligence William Casey.  While the section was rejected by the incumbent Secretary of State George Shultz and Secretary of Defense Caspar Weinberger, it reinforces the idea that the Iran-Iraq conflict was seen as a proxy war by the U.S., and possibly the Soviet Union. Certainly, the Soviet Union would sell to post-revolutionary Iran after 1979, when the U.S. would not.

Apparently, the Soviets also saw opportunities at the same time, presumably to block U.S. influence. In 1985, the Iraqi defense minister said, "Eighty percent of the weapons we capture today (from Iran) are of Soviet origin"

Soviets explore opportunities
Fukuyama observes that the Soviet policy toward the Persian gulf, in 1987 and early 1988, was complex, with several competing goals. Overall, they sought to increase Soviet influence in the region, especially if Western navies left the area. When they made the tactical mistake of chartering tankers, they quickly adapted to moving the Western forces out of the Gulf, "by tilting away from Kuwait and towards Iran. Over the summer of 1989, the Soviets probably hoped the United States could be frightened out of the Gulf...Bolstering Iranian opposition to reflagging would contribute to this result." Such a tilt would serve the objective of building influence with Iran, while offsetting the United States' extensive support to Kuwait.

Export controls
Under the Soviet system, there was little incentive for highly profitable arms exports. Rather, Soviet arms exports were first and foremost governed by military secrecy. If the military determined that a particular piece of equipment, manufacturing technology, or other information was ahead of the equivalent in the West, it would not be available for export, and the foreign military sales organizations of the Soviet Union had no means to appeal.

If there was a question of sensitivity, traditional Soviet decisionmaking was for more, not less, secrecy. Every decision about exporting things of perceived military significance were made centrally, with Party, military and State Security (KGB) input. If a decision was made in favor of exporting, it reflected a consensus of the government.

In 1981, a Central Intelligence Agency document said that the Soviet Union is likely to hasten the delivery of $220 million in "ground equipment", and to permit Eastern European countries to "selectively provide some items in short supply."

Military training and advice
The July 1981 military agreements were described by the Iranians as defensive. They covered training and construction of Iranian bases, but also the construction of Soviet signals intelligence SIGINT bases (see Command, control, communications and intelligence below).  There were agreements to train Iranian personnel in Soviet military schools, and cooperate with the revolutionary secret police, SAVAMA.

Advisors were to wear distinctive uniforms, but with nothing that identified them as Soviets, and were to have their expenses paid in U.S. dollars. The number grew to 3000 by mid-1983, and 4200 in March 1987.

Command, control, communications and intelligence (C3I)
Soviet personnel, in late 1981, started construction of a surveillance station in Baluchistan, in a location that gave a view of the Afghan and Pakistani borders. Radar at this base could monitor all naval traffic through the Strait of Hormuz. They could also monitor supply to the Afghan resistance that came through Pakistan.
The Shoravis were also remarked in Balouchistan, where starting in late 1981 they began work on a network of ground surveillance stations that would be linked to an enormous listening base dug into the side of Kuh-e-Malek-Siah mountain, which dominated the Iranian-Afghan-Pakistani border. Iran allowed this due to concern over the increasingly warm relations between Pakistan, the U.S., and the Arab states of the Persian Gulf. Tehran also agreed to let the installation be built due to the presence of listening stations in Pakistan tuning in on Iran with American help.

Complementing the first station at Kuh-e-Malek-Siah, an intelligence base at Gardaneh Pireh Zan allowed surveillance of air activity in northern Saudi Arabia. Coupled with other Soviet intelligence facilities in South Yemen, Ethiopia, and Syria, the installations achieved complete coverage of the Arabian Peninsula.

Smaller intelligence bases ran on a line Khash, Paskouh, Faslabad, Kalateh-Shah-Taghi, and in the Birag valley. These were operational by 1983-1984.

Land warfare
Both sides captured tanks and other major equipment for the other. Iran developed an enhanced version of the T-54/T-55 tank. It is not clear if Iran ever obtained Russian spare parts for this elderly tank.

Air warfare

While the U.S. officially embargoed parts for the F-14 and its specialized AIM-54 Phoenix long-range air-to-air missile, and there are reports that U.S. technicians, leaving Iran after the Revolution, sabotaged critical parts, the Iranian Air Force found a new role for its F-14 fighters, in command and control. Its AN/AWG-9 radar, unique in capability at the time, allowed Iran to use the F-14's not as front-line fighters, but as "mini-AWACS" early warning and tactical control platforms.

The F-14 and Phoenix have been retired in U.S. service, and there were recent reports of Iran getting spare parts from surplus sales. Obviously, current surplus sales did not affect F-14/AWG-9 use in the war under discussion, but the Associated Press report on the current market quoted Greg Kutz, head of special investigations for the U.S. General Accounting Office as saying "He believes Iran already has Tomcat parts from Pentagon surplus sales: "The key now is, going forward, to shut that down and not let it happen again."

For Iran, the radar is the critical component for the F-14 system. The Phoenix missile was designed for engaging Soviet bombers at very long ranges, in the Outer Air Battle component of the defense of an aircraft carrier battle group, and there are few threats of this type with which Iran needs to cope.

Aircraft
There have been U.S. industry reports that at least one F-14 crew defected to the Soviet Union. This might have been an intelligence coup.

Weapons
These reports suggested that the Vympel R-33 missile (NATO reporting name AMOS AA-9) was reverse-engineered. Gennadiy Sokolovskiy of the Vympel Design Bureau denies that the R-33 was based on the AIM-54 Phoenix, maintaining that he has never actually seen a live Phoenix."

F-14 aircraft in Iranian service also carry the AIM-9 Sidewinder and AIM-7 Sparrow missiles, plus a 20mm cannon; all these are more appropriate for the likely type of combat these aircraft would face—if they are used in combat. Given their unique radar capability, Iran would be more likely to hold back its F-14's and use other fighters, such as the F-4 Phantom, for close engagements.

Air defense
During the war, Iran did not have an integrated air defense system. It did have local air defense systems at Tehran and Kharg Island, a key Iranian oil facility.  Soviet antiaircraft artillery was a key and predictable part of these local defenses, since Iran had significant difficulties obtaining spare parts for its U.S. MIM-23 Hawk surface-to-air missiles These included Soviet antiaircraft artillery and short-range missiles. It is not established how Iran acquired these weapons, which are short-range and presumably used as final point defenses.

Antiaircraft artillery
The Kharg Island defenses included the well-regarded ZSU-23-4 radar-controlled 23mm antiaircraft cannon.

Surface-to-air missiles

Also part of the Kharg Island air defenses were shoulder-fired Strela SA-7 surface-to-air missiles. These missiles have a limited shelf life under less than ideal storage conditions, so they could not have been acquired too long before the Revolution.

Missile technology
In 1985, Iran recognized the embargo forced it to simplify its domestic production goals. One goal was surface-to-surface missiles, which, given the disparity in size and design objectives, are cheaper and less complex than a multirole fighter aircraft such as the U.S. F-4 Phantoms that were the backbone of the Iranian Air Force.

Iran obtained technical assistance from a number of countries, including China and North Korea, Pakistan, Libya, Israel, Argentina, Brazil, West Germany, East Germany, Taiwan, and the USSR. Of these, in 1985, the Soviet Union clearly had the greatest missile expertise. Iran used Scud-B SSMs, presumed to be of Libyan origin, and to which the Soviets voiced no objection.

See also
 International aid to combatants in the Iran–Iraq War
 Iran–Russia relations
 Iraq–Russia relations
 Soviet support for Iran during the Iran–Iraq war
 Soviet support for Iraq during the Iran–Iraq war
 Italian support for Iraq during the Iran–Iraq war
 Iran–Contra affair (clandestine US military supplies to Iran)
 Israel's role in the Iran–Iraq war

References

Sources
 Mohiaddin Mesbahi: "The USSR and the Iran–Iraq War: From Brezhnev to Gorbachev" in Farhang Rajaee (ed.) The Iran–Iraq War: The Politics of Aggression (University Press of Florida, 1993)
 Kazem Sajjadpour: "Neutral Statements, Committed Practice: The USSR and the War" in Farhang Rajaee (ed.) Iranian Perspectives on the Iran–Iraq War (University Press of Florida, 1997)
 Oles M. Smolansky The USSR and Iraq: The Soviet Quest for Influence (Duke University Press, 1991)

Iraq–Soviet Union relations
Iran–Soviet Union relations
Foreign relations during the Iran–Iraq War
1980s in the Soviet Union